Stephen Craig Paddock (April 9, 1953 – October 1, 2017) was an American mass murderer who perpetrated the 2017 Las Vegas shooting. Paddock opened fire into a crowd of about 22,000 concertgoers attending a country music festival on the Las Vegas Strip, killing 60 people and injuring approximately 867 (at least 413 of whom were wounded by gunfire). Paddock killed himself in his hotel room following the shooting. The incident is the deadliest mass shooting by a lone shooter in United States history. Paddock's motive remains officially undetermined, and the possible factors are the subject of speculation.

Paddock was a real-estate investor, property manager, accountant, private pilot and video poker gambler who lived in Mesquite, Nevada.

Early years and education 
Paddock was born in Clinton, Iowa, where his family lived at the time. He grew up in Tucson, Arizona, and the Sun Valley neighborhood of Los Angeles, as the oldest of four sons of Benjamin Paddock and Dolores Hudson. Benjamin was a bank robber who was arrested in 1960 when Stephen was seven years old. Benjamin was later convicted and escaped prison in 1969, subsequently appearing on the FBI's most-wanted list. 

According to Stephen's brother Eric, "he (Benjamin Paddock) was never with my mom", and Stephen had "limited interaction" with Benjamin following the latter's release from prison. According to one of Paddock's ex-wives in a police interview, he had spoken about how growing up with a single mother and the family's financial instability caused him to prioritize being self-reliant and self-sustaining.

Paddock attended Richard E. Byrd Middle School and Sun Valley High School, graduated from John H. Francis Polytechnic High School in 1971, and graduated from California State University, Northridge in 1977, with a degree in business administration.

Career and gambling 
Paddock worked as a letter carrier for the U.S. Postal Service from 1975 to 1978. After that, he worked as an Internal Revenue Service (IRS) agent until 1984. In 1985, he worked as an auditor for the Defense Contract Audit Agency. Toward the end of the 1980s, Paddock worked for three years as an internal auditor for a company that later merged to form Lockheed Martin. He was known to have run a real-estate business with his brother Eric.

Paddock lived in the Greater Los Angeles Area and owned personal property in Panorama City, Cerritos, and North Hollywood from the 1970s to early 2000s. He also owned two apartment buildings in Hawthorne, California. In addition, he owned an apartment complex in Mesquite, Texas, which he sold in 2012.

Relatives said Paddock was worth at least  when he sold off the real-estate business. Among his most profitable investments was an apartment complex purchased in 2004, which gave him more than $500,000 in annual income by 2011. IRS records show he made $5–6 million in profits from its sale in 2015.

Paddock was an avid gambler, and although the extent to which he profited from it is not clear, his reported gambling winnings might have been substantial. He was sometimes seen in high-limit rooms, but he was not well known among high-stakes gamblers in Las Vegas and was not considered a "whale" (high roller) by the casinos. His game of choice was video poker, which he had played for over 25 years. He usually gambled after dark and slept during the day; he disliked being out in the sun.

Personal life 
Paddock was married and divorced twice. He was first married from 1977–1979, and for the second time from 1985–1990, both marriages in Los Angeles County, California. Family members say he stayed on good terms with his ex-wives.

Paddock lived in Texas and California, and then in a retirement community in Melbourne, Florida, from 2013 to 2015. In 2016, he moved from Florida to another retirement home in Mesquite, Nevada. According to property records, he bought a new house in Mesquite in January 2015, and sold his two-bedroom home in Melbourne. 

Paddock lived in Mesquite with his girlfriend whom he had met several years before in Reno, Nevada. According to neighbors, they also lived together in Reno. Many Mesquite residents recalled only seeing him around town; those familiar with Paddock described him as someone who did not speak much and kept a low profile. The local gun owner community never saw him at any of the gun clubs or shooting ranges, including makeshift ones in the nearby desert.

An Australian acquaintance said he met Paddock in the United States and in the Philippines. He described Paddock as intelligent and methodical. In his account, Paddock said he had won money by applying algorithms to gambling on machines. Paddock was conversant in gun laws and in defending his view of the Second Amendment. The acquaintance considered Paddock a generous man whenever he and his girlfriend visited him.

In 2010, Paddock applied for and received a United States passport. He went on 20 cruise ship voyages, visiting several foreign ports including ones in Spain, Italy, Greece, Jordan, and the United Arab Emirates. He was accompanied by his girlfriend on nine of them. They went to the Philippines together in 2013 and 2014. During the last year of his life, they traveled on a cruise to the Middle East. Paddock had his pilot's license since at least 2004 and owned two small planes.

Paddock's only recorded interaction with law enforcement was a minor traffic citation years before the shooting, which he settled in court. According to court records, Paddock also sued the Cosmopolitan of Las Vegas in September 2012, saying he "slipped and fell on an obstruction on the floor" and was injured as a result; the lawsuit settled, and was dismissed with prejudice in October 2014.

Possible contributing factors 
Paddock’s girlfriend stated that he did not talk at length about politics and did not belong to any political organizations. In addition, Paddock increasingly complained of being sick and was sensitive to chemical smells.

During his last months, Paddock reportedly often smelled of alcohol from early morning, and he appeared despondent. He was reported to have filled prescriptions for the anti-anxiety drug Valium in 2013, in 2016, and finally again in June 2017, the latter being four months before the shooting. The chief medical officer of the Las Vegas Recovery Center said the effects of the drug can be magnified by alcohol, as confirmed by Michael First, a clinical psychiatry professor at Columbia University.

During an interview with local CBS affiliate KLAS-TV, Clark County Sheriff Joe Lombardo said Paddock had reportedly been losing "a significant amount of wealth" since September 2015, which led to his having "bouts of depression". According to his girlfriend, she noticed a decline of affection and intimacy towards her from Paddock, who had been romantic at first during their relationship; he attributed it to his declining health.

Leading up to the shooting 

Paddock's gun purchases spiked significantly between October 2016 and September 28, 2017. He purchased over 55 firearms, the majority of them rifles, according to Bureau of Alcohol, Tobacco, Firearms and Explosives. He also purchased a number of firearm-related accessories. Prior to that, he purchased approximately 29 firearms between 1982 and September 2016, mainly handguns and shotguns. His girlfriend noticed the increase of firearm-related purchases but believed his interest in guns was just a hobby.

At his suggestion, two weeks before the attack, his girlfriend went to her native country, the Philippines. Paddock bought her a surprise airline ticket and soon after wired her $100,000 to buy a house there. Most of their communication during this time was primarily through email and text message. He was spotted in Las Vegas with another woman, reported by investigators to be a prostitute. It was later confirmed that this woman was not an accomplice nor considered a suspect, and her name has not been released. Two days prior to the shooting, Paddock was recorded by a home surveillance system driving alone to an area for target practice located near his home.

Las Vegas shooting 

On the night of October 1, 2017, starting at 10:05 , Paddock fired more than 1,000 rounds from his hotel room, Room 32‑135, at the Mandalay Bay Hotel and Casino, onto a large crowd of concertgoers at the Route 91 Harvest music festival on the Las Vegas Strip, ultimately killing 60 people and wounding 867 others. He then shot and killed himself.

Paddock meticulously planned the attack. On September 25, six days before the shooting, he checked into the hotel with 10 shooting-range bags and a computer. 

On September 29, he moved into an additional suite, 32-134, connected to the first one; both rooms overlooked the festival grounds. He stayed in both in the days leading up to the shooting. After Paddock killed himself, the police found 23 rifles and one handgun inside his rooms. They included fourteen .223-caliber AR-15 type rifles, eight .308 caliber AR-10 type rifles, one .308 caliber Ruger American bolt-action rifle, and one .38 caliber Smith & Wesson model 342 revolver, all very expensive, according to a law enforcement source. His arsenal included a large quantity of ammunition in special high-capacity magazines holding up to 100 cartridges each. Some of the rifles were resting on bipods, and were equipped with high-tech telescopic sights. All fourteen AR-15-type rifles were outfitted with bump stocks that allow semiautomatic rifles to fire rapidly, simulating fully-automatic gunfire. Audio recordings of the attack indicated Paddock used these stocks to fire at the crowd in rapid succession.

At some point during the attack on concertgoers, Paddock – who had placed a baby monitor camera on a service cart outside his room – fired about 35 rounds through his door. The shots wounded approaching hotel security guard Jesus Campos. The unarmed Campos had attempted to enter the 32nd floor first at 9:59  on an unrelated matter but he found the door to the hallway screwed shut by Paddock. At 10:05 , Paddock began firing hundreds of rounds in rapid succession at the crowd below. He initially started off with a few single gunshots before firing in prolonged bursts. He stopped shooting ten minutes later at 10:15 . It is speculated that at that time Paddock committed suicide, shooting himself through the mouth.

According to the chronology of events established by the authorities in the following days, the first two police officers reached the 32nd floor of the hotel at 10:17 . A minute later, they were shown the location of Paddock's door. Between 10:26 and 10:30 , an additional eight LVMPD officers joined them and began clearing other suites along the 32nd floor hallway. At 10:55 , eight SWAT team members entered the 32nd floor through the second stairwell nearest to Paddock's suite. Once all the other rooms on the floor had been cleared, at 11:20  — more than an hour after the first two officers arrived and 65 minutes after Paddock had ceased firing—police breached his door with an explosive charge and entered the room. Paddock was found dead from a self-inflicted gunshot to the head.

Investigation 
In addition to the firearms and accessories found in Paddock's hotel room, there was a note that included handwritten calculations about where he needed to aim to maximize his accuracy. The note contained the actual distance to the target, his pinpoint own elevation and the bullet trajectory relative to the line of fire. There were also several laptops in the suite, one of which was missing a hard drive. Computer forensics discovered hundreds of images of child pornography on the laptops. Paddock’s brother, Bruce Paddock, was arrested in Los Angeles in October in an unrelated child pornography investigation (referred to as "Daniel Paddock" in other sources).

However, investigators clarified that while Paddock had "nefarious intent" with the material, he did not appear to have assembled an explosive device. An additional 19 firearms were found at his home.

Motive 
According to police, Paddock acted alone. His motive remains unknown. There has been some discussion around brain pathology initially thought to be benign as a possible contributor. Paddock's remains were sent to Stanford University to receive a more extensive analysis of his brain. The Stanford pathologists found no abnormalities present within the brain.

Investigators believe he was obsessed with cleanliness and possibly had bipolar disorder. Although a doctor did offer him antidepressants, he only accepted anxiety medication and it was reported that he was fearful of medication and often refused to take it.  The doctor also described Paddock as "odd" and showing "little emotion". Psychologists ex post facto have noted a distinct similarity between Paddock's demeanor and the psychological construct alexithymia, which might have modulated his decision to conduct the shooting given its association with various mass murderers throughout history.

The Islamic State (IS) tried to claim responsibility for the shooting, claiming Paddock was Abu Abdul Barr al-Amriki, and stated that Paddock had converted to Islam six months prior to the terrorist attack, but United States law enforcement officials have given no evidence of a connection between Paddock and IS. Stephen described himself as an atheist and often said to his Catholic girlfriend "your God doesn't love me".

In popular culture
Stephen Paddock and the shooting was covered in the "One October: Massacre on the Strip" episode of Lies, Crime & Videos. A title card at the beginning of the episode states that some of the over 22,000 hours of video covered in the episode is being shown for the first time.
In rapper Eminem's song titled "Darkness" on his January 2020 album Music to Be Murdered By, the song and the accompanying music video portrays Stephen Paddock's thought process before the shooting while also serving as a metaphor for Eminem's nervousness before a concert performance.

Notes

References 
 

1953 births
2017 Las Vegas shooting
21st-century American criminals
American accountants
American atheists
American gamblers
American mass murderers
Articles containing video clips
California State University, Northridge alumni
Criminals from Arizona
Criminals from California
Criminals from Iowa
Criminals from Nevada
John H. Francis Polytechnic High School alumni
Murder–suicides in Nevada
People from Clinton, Iowa
People from Mesquite, Nevada
People from Sun Valley, Los Angeles
Suicides by firearm in Nevada
People from Tucson, Arizona
American male criminals
2017 suicides
Male murderers